Puamau is an associated commune on the island of Hiva Oa, in French Polynesia. According to the 2017 census, it had a population of 309 people.

References

Populated places in the Marquesas Islands